Antibody mimetics are organic compounds that, like antibodies, can specifically bind antigens, but that are not structurally related to antibodies. They are usually artificial peptides or proteins with a molar mass of about 3 to 20 kDa. (Antibodies are ~150 kDa.)

Nucleic acids and small molecules are sometimes considered antibody mimetics as well, but not artificial antibodies, antibody fragments and fusion proteins composed from these.

Common advantages over antibodies are better solubility, tissue penetration, stability towards heat and enzymes, and comparatively low production costs. Antibody mimetics are being developed as therapeutic and diagnostic agents.

Examples

See also
Protein mimetic
Optimer Ligand

References